You and I is a compilation album by Jeff Buckley, released on March 11, 2016, on Legacy Recordings. The songs were recorded in 1993 and represent some of his earliest recordings for Columbia.

Background and composition
The sessions for the album took place in February 1993 and were designed to produce what A&R rep Steve Berkowitz referred to as a "Table of Contents" for the singer. The 2016 release of the album marks the first time these session recordings have been made available to the public. According to his mother, Buckley was insecure about the sessions, leading him to make several calls to her during the middle of the night about fears of being fired.

In addition to several cover songs the album also features two original Buckley compositions; an early demo of "Grace" which would later appear on Buckley's debut album of the same name and "Dream of You and I". Album producer Steve Addabbo had opined that, at that stage of his career, Buckley may have been so adept at covers that he had difficulty coming up with his own material.

Commercial reception
The album debuted at No. 58 on the Billboard 200, No. 5 on the Top Rock Albums and No. 1 on the Folk Albums charts, selling 9,000 copies on its first week of release.

Track listing

EXPANDED EDITION

Charts

References

2016 compilation albums
Albums published posthumously
Jeff Buckley albums
Legacy Recordings albums
Albums produced by Steve Addabbo
Covers albums